Arnold Leonard Epstein, known as Bill Epstein (13 September 1924, Liverpool – 9 November 1999, Hove), was a British social anthropologist. A member of the "Manchester School", he was known for his research on ethnicity and identity, particularly his book Ethos and Identity (1978), and for his ethnographic work in Central Africa and New Britain. He was a professor at the Australian National University (1958–1972) and Sussex University (1972–1982), as well as the vice president of the Royal Anthropological Institute (1982–1984). He was married to T. Scarlett Epstein and had two daughters.

References

Further reading

External links 
 Arnold Leonard and T. Scarlett Epstein Papers at the Online Archive of California

1924 births
1999 deaths
Academics from Liverpool
British anthropologists
Social anthropologists
Academic staff of the Australian National University
Academics of the University of Sussex
Alumni of the University of Manchester
20th-century anthropologists